Dandini is an Italian surname. Notable people with the surname include:

Cesare Dandini (1596–1657), Italian painter
Girolamo Dandini (1509–1559), Italian Cardinal
Girolamo Dandini (1554–1634), Italian Jesuit
Ottaviano Dandini (?-1750), Italian painter and Jesuit
Pietro Dandini (1646–1712), Italian painter
Vincenzo Dandini (1607–1675), Italian painter

See also
Dandini (character), servant of Prince Charming in the story of Cinderella

Italian-language surnames